Eduard Metchikyan (born 28 February 1996) is a Bulgarian-Armenian retired footballer who played as a goalkeeper and now refree.

Career

Early career
Metchikyan bеgan his career in Lokomotiv Sofia. In 2014, he moved to FC Sozopol and on 2015  he joined A Group sided PFC Haskovo. On 25 May 2015 he made official debut in A Group for the team, replacing the injured Nikolay Bankov in the 13th minute.

Czech Republic
In January 2016 Eduard signed with the Czech third level team Líšeň until end of the season with the option to move to Czech First League team Zbrojovka Brno after his contract expires. Metchikiyan also would train with Zbrojovka while he plays for Líšeň.

Career statistics

Club

References

External links
 

Living people
1996 births
Footballers from Sofia
Bulgarian footballers
Armenian footballers
Association football goalkeepers
First Professional Football League (Bulgaria) players
Bulgarian people of Armenian descent
FC Haskovo players
OFC Bdin Vidin players
SK Líšeň players